O'Toole Creek is a stream in the U.S. state of Washington.

O'Toole Creek was named after W. D. O'Toole, a businessperson in the mining industry.

See also
List of rivers of Washington

References

Rivers of Skagit County, Washington
Rivers of Washington (state)